Colson Baker (born April 22, 1990), known professionally as Machine Gun Kelly (MGK), is an American rapper, singer, songwriter, and actor. He is noted for his genre duality across alternative rock with hip hop.

Machine Gun Kelly released four mixtapes between 2007 and 2010 before signing with Bad Boy Records. He released his debut studio album, Lace Up, in 2012, which peaked at number four on the US Billboard 200 and contained his breakout single "Wild Boy" (featuring Waka Flocka Flame). His second and third albums, General Admission (2015) and Bloom (2017), achieved similar commercial success; the latter included the single "Bad Things" (with Camila Cabello), which peaked at number 4 on the Billboard Hot 100. His fourth album, Hotel Diablo (2019), included rap rock.

Machine Gun Kelly released his fifth album, Tickets to My Downfall, in 2020; it marked a complete departure from hip hop and entry into pop-punk. It debuted at number one on the Billboard 200, the only rock album to do so that year, and contained the single "My Ex's Best Friend", which reached number 20 on the Hot 100. He achieved similar commercial success with its follow up Mainstream Sellout (2022).

Machine Gun Kelly had his first starring role in the romantic drama Beyond the Lights (2014), and since appeared in the techno-thriller Nerve (2016), the horror Bird Box (2018), the comedy Big Time Adolescence and portrayed Tommy Lee in the biopic The Dirt (both 2019).

Early life
Baker was born on April 22, 1990, in Houston to Christian missionary parents. Baker and his family moved all around the world and he lived in Egypt for the first 4 years of his life. He also moved to Germany as well as throughout the United States, in Chicago, Denver, and Cleveland. Baker's mother left home when he was nine years old and he and his father moved to Denver to live with Baker's aunt. Baker's father fought depression and unemployment. Baker says he had just two school outfits and that he endured bullying from children in his neighborhood. 

He began listening to rap in the sixth grade, when he attended Hamilton Middle School, a school with an ethnically diverse student body in Denver. While he lived in Cleveland, Baker attended Shaker Heights High School.

The first three rappers that got him into the genre of hip hop as a child were Ludacris, Eminem and DMX, with Baker gaining interest in the genre after listening to DMX's "We Right Here" from the album The Great Depression (2001).

Career

Early career

In March 2009, while he was on the verge of getting evicted, Baker traveled to Harlem's Apollo Theater, where he had consecutive victories, making him the first ever rapper to win at the Apollo Theater. He recorded music in his home studio, which he refers to as the "Rage Cage", and started to gain exposure when he was featured on MTV2's Sucker Free Freestyle, where he freestyled numerous verses from his "Chip off the Block" single. In February 2010, he released his second mixtape 100 Words and Running, where he derived his catchphrase, "Lace Up", which started as a mixtape interlude, before making it a prominent reference in his music. Despite his rising popularity, Baker found himself working at Chipotle to afford rent, as well as being kicked out by his father after high school. Baker soon also became a father.

In May 2010, he made his national debut with the single "Alice in Wonderland", which was released on iTunes and accompanied a music video along with the song. It was released via Block Starz Music. The single earned Baker the "Best Midwest Artist" at the 2010 Underground Music Awards and his "Alice in Wonderland" clip won Best Music Video at the 2010 Ohio Hip-Hop Awards. He released his second mixtape in November 2010 titled Lace Up which featured the hometown anthem "Cleveland", which was then played at Cleveland Cavaliers home games and went on rotation on Z107.9 in Cleveland. The mixtape was recorded in three months in 2010 during a creative burst. Following the release of the mixtape, he was featured in the magazine XXL in 2011. He then appeared on the Juicy J track "Inhale", which also featured Steve-O from the television series Jackass, in the music video.

In March 2011, Baker participated in his first SXSW show in Austin, Texas, and at the show, he was approached by Sean Combs, who had offered Baker a recording contract with Bad Boy Records, which is associated with and has its content distributed by Interscope. Prior to the contract, he was featured on the XV song "Finally Home".

2012–2015: Lace Up and General Admission

Baker announced that his debut album would be titled Lace Up, and would have an intended release on October 9, 2012. "Wild Boy" served as the lead single for the album and the song peaked on the US Billboard Hot 100 at number 98. It was soon certified gold by the RIAA. The song "Invincible" was released on iTunes on December 16, 2011, featuring co-writer and singer Ester Dean as the second single of the album. The song is featured in a commercial for the HTC ReZound as well as the official theme song of WrestleMania XXVIII. WWE also used the song to highlight John Cena in his match with at the event, with Baker also performing at WrestleMania prior to the main event. "Invincible" is also currently the theme for Thursday Night Football on the NFL network. WWE also used the song "All We Have" to again highlight Cena on his rematch with The Rock at next year's event. On December 14, 2011, Baker was named the Hottest Breakthrough MC of 2011 by MTV. On March 18, 2012, Baker won the MTVu Breaking Woodie award before being featured on the cover of XXL as part of their annual "Top 10 Freshmen list" along with fellow rappers Macklemore, French Montana, Hopsin, Danny Brown, Iggy Azalea, Roscoe Dash, Future, Don Trip and Kid Ink. On August 13, 2012, Baker self-released a mixtape titled EST 4 Life, which contained both old and recently recorded material.

Lace Up was released on October 9, 2012. The album featured guest appearances from Bun B, Cassie, DMX, Ester Dean, Lil Jon, Tech N9ne, Twista, Waka Flocka Flame, Young Jeezy and Dub-O. The album debuted at number 4 on the US Billboard 200, with first-week sales of 57,000 copies. It slid down to No. 22 in its second week, giving it a total of 65,000 copies sold. As of September 2015, the album has sold 263,000 copies.

In early 2012, Baker announced that he would be releasing a new mixtape. Pusha T and Meek Mill were the first artists to be featured on the mixtape, both appearing on the track "Pe$o". Baker also announced that Wiz Khalifa will be featured on the mixtape. On February 18, 2013, Baker announced the name of the mixtape as Black Flag and revealed the cover. He also released a music video for "Champions" which features Diddy and samples The Diplomats song "We are the Champions", as the music video release served as a promotional video for Black Flag. On June 26, Baker released Black Flag without prior announcement. The mixtape also featured guest appearances from French Montana, Kellin Quinn, Dub-O, Sean McGee and Tezo. On June 4, 2013, Baker posted a picture of a letter on his social media accounts which read: This project is dedicated to love, because for my entire life it has been taken from me. Granted, when it was given, I pushed it right back. I couldn't handle it. This was until I experienced the loss of love for what I love doing most: music. That was the one thing worth fighting for, even more-so then[sic] the love of my father. I've found that love again. And I plan on never surrendering it. Find what you love and fight!! Black Flag.

Following the release of Black Flag, rumors surfaced that Baker had begun working on his second studio album. In January 2014, he confirmed that he was in the early stages of working on the album, with 2015 being the scheduled year of release. On January 5, 2015, Baker released the song "Till I Die", which was accompanied with a music video on his VEVO account. Months later, a remix of "Till I Die" with hometown fellow hip-hop group Bone Thugs-n-Harmony was confirmed and released on June 5, 2015. The song aired via WorldStarHipHop and featured French Montana, Yo Gotti and Ray Cash. On May 18, 2015, the music video for another song titled "A Little More" was released, with the single featuring vocals from Victoria Monet. Baker soon had an interview with MTV, describing the reason as to why he wrote "A Little More". Stating in the interview: "People always came up to me after the first album and a lot of my friends back home said 'we need something for the streets' and then I did Till I Die. Months later, when I look back at the video [for Till I Die] I [was] like 'Okay, he's in jail, he's shot, he's dead, he snitched' and just to the point where it's sad and I wrote the song to describe how I see the world as a much mature person." He also updated the status on his second studio album, noting that the album is finished, and stating that the album would contain "more lyricism and [would be more] stylistically [influenced by] hip-hop but musically, sonically [would contain] more live instrumentation."

On June 25, Baker released the title of his second album as General Admission, due to be released in late September 2015.

2016–2019: Bloom, feud with Eminem and Hotel Diablo

In February, Baker appeared at Fastlane, which was hosted at the Quicken Loans Arena in downtown Cleveland. Baker released "Bad Things" in late 2016, a joint single with Camila Cabello, which has reached a peak of number four on the US Billboard Hot 100.

Baker was going to be the opening act on the North American leg of Linkin Park's One More Light Tour before the tour was cancelled due to Linkin Park frontman Chester Bennington's suicide. Baker would subsequently pay tribute to Bennington by releasing an acoustic cover of the Linkin Park song "Numb".

On September 3, 2018, Baker released the song "Rap Devil". The track was a response to Eminem's diss track "Not Alike" off of his album Kamikaze. Playing on Eminem's own "Rap God" single, the track accuses Eminem of trying to sideline Baker's career after a comment Baker made in 2012 about Eminem's teenage daughter, Hailie. Baker publicly stated on his Twitter account that on the response track he was "standing up for not just myself, but my generation. [I'm] doing the same shit you did back in your day." "Rap Devil" topped the iTunes Chart on September 10, 2018. On September 14, 2018, Eminem responded to "Rap Devil" with his own diss track, "Killshot".

On September 21, 2018, Baker released the EP Binge, which had first week sales of 21,519 units and debuted at 24 on the Billboard 200.

In April 2019, Billboard reported that Baker's upcoming album would be titled Hotel Diablo. The first single, "Hollywood Whore", was released on May 17, 2019. The second single, "El Diablo", was released on May 31, 2019. On June 7, 2019, Baker released the third single, "I Think I'm Okay", with Yungblud and Travis Barker, a pop punk song. Hotel Diablo was released on July 5, 2019. On July 9, 2019, he released the official music video for "Candy" featuring Trippie Redd. He released the final single, "Glass House" featuring Naomi Wild on the same day. The album debuted at number 5 on the Billboard 200 chart, becoming his fourth top ten album.

On December 18, 2020, Baker released the single "Why Are You Here", another pop punk song. Later on in the same month, he began teasing an upcoming project with Travis Barker producing, it was then later revealed that the album would be an entirely pop punk, stating he was inspired to pursue a whole release in the style because of his two previously released in the genre.

2020–present: Tickets to My Downfall and Mainstream Sellout 

On January 14, 2020, Baker announced the title of the project as Tickets to My Downfall, and that it would be released on September 25, 2020. On March 17, 2020, he released the song "Bullets with Names", featuring Young Thug, RJMrLA and Lil Duke, a rap track not associated with the album. During the COVID-19 lockdowns, Baker began to release daily recordings, covers, and collaborations as part of his #LockdownSessions series. Releases included covers of "Misery Business" by Paramore (with Travis Barker), "Champagne Supernova" by Oasis (with Yungblud), and a remix of "My House" by PVRIS. Some tracks were later re-released on special editions of Tickets to My Downfall. Tickets to My Downfalls first single "Bloody Valentine" was released on May 1, 2020, followed by "Concert for Aliens" on August 5 and "My Ex's Best Friend" featuring Blackbear on August 7.

In August 2020, Baker opened his own coffee house called 27 Club Coffee in his hometown of Cleveland, Ohio. On September 29, 2020, a music video was released for the Tickets to my Downfall song "Drunk Face", directed by Mod Sun, which was followed on October 22, 2020, by a music video for "Forget Me Too". Throughout October 2020, the four episodes of Halloween in Hell, a fictionalised musical horror podcast that Baker created and starred in, were released. The series also starred Iann Dior, 24kGoldn, Dana Dentata, Phem and Tommy Lee. The podcast was accompanied by the album Audio Up presents: Original Music from Halloween In Hell a soundtrack performed collaboratively by all the actors involved, and written and composed by Jared Gutstadt. Baker directed the music video for Mod Sun's song "Karma", which was released on November 12, 2020.

On November 22, 2020, after his performance at the AMAs, Baker announced his album Tickets to My Downfall was going to be turned into a "first if it’s kind musical film experience" titled Downfalls High which will air in January 2021. On November 30, 2020, Yungblud announced on Twitter he'll be releasing a new collaboration featuring Baker and Travis Barker titled "Acting Like That". On January 15, 2021, Baker released Downfalls High on his Facebook page followed by a release to YouTube on January 18. Directed by Baker and Mod Sun and narrated by Baker and Barker, the film stars Chase Hudson and Sydney Sweeney as teenage lovers in what Baker described as a "pop-punk [version of] Grease". Iann Dior, Phem, Jxdn, and Trippie Redd, also make appearances.

On March 12, 2021, he released the single "DayWalker" featuring Corpse Husband. On April 29, he released the single "Love Race" featuring Kellin Quinn, the pair's third collaboration.

On August 9, 2021, he announced that his next album would be titled Born with Horns, and would be another collaborative project with Barker. The first single, "Papercuts", was released on August 11. On January 30, 2022, he posted a preview of a collaboration with singer Willow titled "Emo Girl".

On August 26, 2021, it was announced that he would star in and co-direct the film Good Mourning, alongside Mod Sun, Dove Cameron, Megan Fox and Becky G. On February 5, 2022, Machine Gun Kelly performed during the 2022 NHL All-Star Game halftime show in Las Vegas.

On January 31, 2022, Kelly announced that the album had been retitled to Mainstream Sellout.

Musical style and influences
Baker's musical style has been mainly described as hip hop, pop-rap, and rap rock.
His fifth album, Tickets to My Downfall, marked a change in sound and has been described as pop-punk and alternative rock.

Baker cites DMX and Eminem as music influences, as well as listening to rock bands Guns N' Roses and Blink-182 during his youth. Baker cites these rap and rock artists as major musical influences. In an interview discussing his collaboration with DMX, Baker called the rapper his idol. He also stated that DMX's music helped him through his troubles while growing up, especially bullying.

Acting career
Baker made his film debut in the 2014 romantic drama Beyond the Lights, where he played a "shallow, self-important" rapper named Kid Culprit. In 2016, he co-starred and co-executive produced the drama film The Land, a Cleveland-set drama produced by fellow rapper Nas. The same year, he had a minor role in the techno-thriller adventure film Nerve with Emma Roberts and Dave Franco; and had a recurring role on the Showtime comedy-drama series Roadies as Wes, a former Pearl Jam roadie.

He played Felix in the 2018 Netflix post-apocalyptic horror thriller film Bird Box with Sandra Bullock, and portrayed drummer Tommy Lee in The Dirt, a 2019 Netflix biographical comedy-drama about Mötley Crüe. He played the role of Newt in the 2020 superhero film Project Power opposite Jamie Foxx, and the following year, he co-starred with Bruce Willis and Megan Fox in the crime thriller film Midnight in the Switchgrass; and starred in the action western film The Last Son with Sam Worthington. Baker played the role of "London Clash" in the self-directed film Good Mourning, released in 2022.

Personal life
In his teens, Baker was in a relationship with Emma Cannon, with whom he has a daughter, who was born in July 2009.

He is open about his use of cannabis and has claimed in many interviews that he smokes daily, describing it as a "source of happiness and a way people can feel a little more love [in their own right]". He has frequently mentioned cannabis references within sources of his music and rap persona, making it a forefront of both his rap and personal character. For a period prior to the release of Lace Up he had an addiction to heroin. He was also a heavy user of cocaine and alcohol prior to 2020. In November 2020, Baker revealed that he had formed an addiction for Adderall, and is seeking treatment.

In a 2012 interview, he stated that he identifies politically as an anarchist.

Baker was in a relationship with model and actress Amber Rose for two months beginning in April 2015. He dated model Sommer Ray from March to April 2020. Since May 2020, he has been in a relationship with actress Megan Fox after the two met while filming Midnight in the Switchgrass. On January 12, 2022, Fox announced that the two were engaged.

Feuds

Eminem
Baker's feud with Eminem began on May 7, 2012, when he wrote a tweet saying that Eminem's daughter Hailie was "hot as fuck", despite her being 16 at the time. In an interview with WQHT on October 19, 2015, Baker alleged this led to Eminem blacklisting him from a number of radio stations. On May 16, 2017, Baker performed a freestyle for KPWR, which featured a line referencing Eminem's supposed banning of him from Shade 45. On March 1, 2018, Baker featured on a verse of Tech N9ne's song, "No Reason". Shortly after, on August 31, 2018, Eminem released his diss track, "Not Alike" where he claimed that Baker's verse on the song was about him. On September 3, 2018, Baker responded to this with his own diss track "Rap Devil". On September 12, 2018, Eminem released an interview with Sway Calloway through his YouTube channel where he discussed his reason behind the feud. On September 14, 2018, Eminem released "Killshot", in response to "Rap Devil". 

On January 17, 2020, Eminem released the song "Unaccommodating", which featured a verse directed at Baker. On March 17, 2020, Baker released the song "Bullets with Names", featuring Young Thug, RJMrLA and Lil Duke, which featured a verse directed at Eminem. On December 18, 2020, Eminem released the song "Gnat". In this song, Eminem dissed Baker in the chorus. On December 15, 2021, Dr. Dre released a song titled "Gospel" off his new EP The Contract featuring Eminem and The D.O.C. In this song, Eminem dissed Baker again.

G-Eazy
Baker's feud with G-Eazy began after the end of G-Eazy's relationship with Halsey, when photographs of Baker and Halsey together surfaced. On July 18, 2018, G-Eazy revealed that he had bleached his hair blond, which Baker alleged on Twitter was in an attempt to look like him. On August 30, 2018, G-Eazy released the diss track "Bad Boy" against Baker, who responded the next day in a freestyle performed for Hot 97. The same day, Baker tweeted side-by-side photos of the two, with the caption "I fucked his girl now he looks like me this shit overbearing". In the track "Killshot", Eminem defended G-Eazy and the two ended the feud in April 2019, through what NME described as an "intervention by Eminem".

Corey Taylor
In 2021, Baker engaged in a feud with Slipknot frontman Corey Taylor after being alluded to in an interview where Taylor stated: "I hate all new rock for the most part — well, the artists who failed in one genre and decided to go rock. And I think he knows who he is, but that’s another story." At Riot Fest in September 2021, Baker and Slipknot were scheduled to play on the same day and time, albeit on different stages. Baker took the opportunity to respond to Taylor's comments, beginning his set by asking the crew to light the crowd so he could "see who chose to be here instead of with all the old weird dudes with masks." He later insulted the band again by stating, "You wanna know what I’m really happy that I'm not doing? Being 50 years old, wearing a fuckin’ weird mask on a fuckin’ stage, talking shit." 

Later on, Baker revealed on Twitter that Taylor was originally meant to feature on "Can't Look Back", a song for Tickets to My Downfall, but the collaboration did not come to fruition because Baker thought the verse was "fucking terrible" and accused Taylor of being bitter about not being featured on the album. Taylor responded to the tweet by sharing screenshots of emails between himself and Travis Barker, producer of Tickets to My Downfall, that showed he was the one who respectfully declined to appear on the track due to creative differences. In response, Baker stated that he had simply wanted Taylor to rewrite his verse, reiterating his previous assertion that it was "really bad." 

Taylor later addressed the feud during a fan Q&A in January 2022 where he claimed that Baker had started it. He went on to insult Baker's change in musical direction and told him to "suck every inch of my dick." 

In July 2022, Baker admitted in his Life in Pink documentary that he regretted his feud with Taylor and wished that both of them handled the situation better instead of acting "ridiculous."

Backing band
Current members
Steve "Baze" Basil – bass, keyboards (2017–present)
Brandon "Slimxx" Allen – keyboards, backing vocals (2017–present)
JP "Rook" Cappelletty – drums (2017–present)
Travis Barker – drums (2019–present)
Justin "Jus" Lyons – guitars (2021–present)
Sophie Lloyd – guitars (2022–present)

Former members
AJ Tyus – guitars (2017–2021)

DiscographyStudio albums Lace Up (2012)
 General Admission (2015)
 Bloom (2017)
 Hotel Diablo (2019)
 Tickets to My Downfall (2020)
 Mainstream Sellout (2022)

ToursHeadlining tours Hostile Takeover Tour (2012)
 No Class Tour (2014)
 Alpha Omega Tour (2016)
 27 World Tour (2017)
 Hotel Diablo World Tour (2019)
 Tickets to My Downfall Tour (2021)
 Mainstream Sellout Tour (2022)Co-headlining tours'
 The Justin Bieber Big Tour (with Young Thug) (2019)

Filmography

Film 
For film roles, he is credited as Colson Baker unless otherwise noted.

Television

Video games

Internet

Audio

Awards and nominations

References

External links

 
 
 

1990 births
Living people
21st-century American male actors
21st-century American male musicians
21st-century American rappers
American alternative rock musicians
American male film actors
American male pop singers
American male rappers
American punk rock singers
Bad Boy Records artists
Male actors from Cleveland
Male actors from Houston
Midwest hip hop musicians
MTV Europe Music Award winners
Musicians from Shaker Heights, Ohio
Rap rock musicians
Rappers from Cleveland
Songwriters from Ohio
Pop rappers
Pop punk musicians